Norman Major (born April 9, 1934) is a member of the New Hampshire House of Representatives, representing Rockingham District 14 (Atkinson and Plaistow). He is Chairman of the Ways and Means Committee and lives in Plaistow.

Major was born in Keene, New Hampshire. He married Brenda Major in 1961; the Majors have four sons and six grandchildren. Major graduated from the University of New Hampshire and earned an MSEE from Northeastern University. He served in the U.S. Army and is now retired from a career in engineering management with AT&T.

References

Living people
University of New Hampshire alumni
Northeastern University alumni
Republican Party members of the New Hampshire House of Representatives
21st-century American politicians
People from Keene, New Hampshire
People from Plaistow, New Hampshire
1934 births